Robert Gordon Kitchen  (born 1957) is a Canadian politician of the Conservative Party elected as a Member of Parliament in the House of Commons of Canada to represent the federal electoral district of Souris—Moose Mountain at the 2015 Canadian federal election.

Biography

Kitchen was born in England, while his father, a major general in the Canadian Armed Forces, was stationed there. When he was sixteen years old, he was hit by a drunk driver while riding a bicycle. As a result, he is deaf in his left ear.  He lived in Canada, England, Pakistan, Afghanistan, Iran and the United States as a child. He attended the University of Waterloo, graduating with a B.Sc. (Hons.) degree in Kinesiology, before attending the Canadian Memorial Chiropractic College where he earned his Doctor of Chiropractic (D.C). Kitchen later completed a two-year specialty fellowship in chiropractic clinical sciences, including a six-month residency at the Royal University Hospital Department of Orthopedics in Saskatoon as well as a postgraduate degree in educational administration at the University of Regina.

Kitchen owned and operated a private chiropractic clinic for the past 26 years in Estevan and is a board member of the Chiropractors’ Association of Saskatchewan (CAS); a registrar for the CAS for 6 years; and president of the Canadian Federation of Chiropractic Regulatory, Educational and Accreditation Board (CRCREAB) for 4 years.

Personal

Kitchen is married to his wife, Donna, and has three grown children, Andrew, Kathryn and Stephen.

Electoral record

References

External links
 

Living people
Conservative Party of Canada MPs
Members of the House of Commons of Canada from Saskatchewan
People from Estevan
University of Waterloo alumni
University of Regina alumni
Deaf politicians
Canadian politicians with disabilities
Canadian chiropractors
21st-century Canadian politicians
Canadian deaf people
Canadian Memorial Chiropractic College alumni
1957 births